The 2010 Clarkson Cup was contested at the  Elgin Barrow Arena in  Richmond Hill,  Ontario, Canada. The four competing teams included the  Brampton Thunder,  Minnesota Whitecaps, Mississauga Chiefs, and Montreal Stars.

Qualification
The Brampton Thunder defeated the Burlington Barracudas in the Canadian Women's Hockey League wild card game to qualify for the Clarkson Cup tournament. The Thunder proceeded to eliminate the defending champion Montreal Stars in the semifinals.

Brampton Thunder roster

Minnesota Whitecaps roster

Tournament

Semifinals

Finals

Championship game
The Minnesota Whitecaps were the only team from the Western Women's Hockey League to compete in the tournament. It was the second consecutive year that the Whitecaps had made the final. The team came to the tournament with only 11 players and two goalies. Goalie Megan Van Beusekom-Sweerin had a shutout in a 4-0 win for the Whitecaps.

Scoring summary
Chelsey Brodt-Rosenthal snapped a wrist shot past Thunder netminder Laura Hosier. During the first period, the Whitecaps hit the post twice. In the second period, Jenny Potter scored on a breakaway. The assist was credited to Erin Keys. In the second period, the Thunder were not able to get on the scoreboard. Molly Engstrom fired a slap shot past Van Beusekom-Sweerin, but the shot hit the post.  In the third period, Maggie Fisher scored on a pass from Megan McCarthy. Andrea Fisher intercepted a pass from the Thunder. She passed to Brooke White-Lancette and scored the fourth goal on Hosier.

Awards and honours
  Megan Van Beusekom-Sweerin: Top goaltender in the tournament
  Brooke White, Player of the Game, Minnesota, Clarkson Cup Final
 Bobbi Jo Slusar, Player of the Game, Brampton, Clarkson Cup Final
  Julie Chu, Minnesota, Tournament MVP.
 Lori Dupuis, Brampton, Top forward in the tournament
 Molly Engstrom, Brampton, Top defender in the tournament

Olympians in the Clarkson Cup
The following players also played for their respective countries in ice hockey at the 2010 Winter Olympics.

References

External links
 Minnesota Whitecaps: Clarkson Cup Champions Bruce Peter, 17 June 2010.

See also
 Clarkson Cup
 Minnesota Whitecaps

Clarkson Cup
Clarkson Cup
Richmond Hill, Ontario
2010